KOVC (1490 AM) is a radio station based in Valley City, North Dakota, United States. It is a full service station, with frequent weather, news and sports updates. KOVC plays mostly country music and covers local and national sports games.

FM translator

External links
News Dakota

OVC
Country radio stations in the United States
Full service radio stations in the United States
Radio stations established in 1983